is a Japanese photographer.

See also
List of Japanese photographers
Photography in Japan

References

Japanese photographers
1940 births
Living people
Place of birth missing (living people)
20th-century Japanese photographers